William Gene Kennedy (born November 10, 1966) is an American professional basketball referee for the National Basketball Association (NBA).

Kennedy graduated from St. Mary's High School in Phoenix, Arizona, and Arizona State University. He refereed in the Continental Basketball Association (CBA), refereeing the 1995 and 1996 CBA Finals. He began as an NBA referee during the 1995-96 NBA season. He has refereed five NBA Finals games, as well as the 2010 FIBA World Championships and the 2012 Summer Olympics.

Kennedy ejected Boston Celtics' coach Doc Rivers from a game on March 17, 2009. Rivers was fined $25,000 for remarks he made about Kennedy after the game, and Kennedy was fined an undisclosed amount for his handling of the situation. Rivers reportedly used a gay slur towards Kennedy during the 2009 NBA Playoffs.

In December 2015, Kennedy ejected Rajon Rondo from a game, and Rondo used a gay slur towards Kennedy, which resulted in a one-game suspension for Rondo. Kennedy later revealed that he is gay.

References

External links
 Basketball Reference

Living people
1966 births
National Basketball Association referees
American LGBT sportspeople
Sportspeople from Phoenix, Arizona
Arizona State University alumni
Gay sportsmen
LGBT people from Arizona
LGBT African Americans
African-American sports officials
Continental Basketball Association referees
21st-century African-American people
20th-century African-American sportspeople
21st-century LGBT people